This Is Exile is the second studio album by American deathcore band Whitechapel. It was produced by Jonny Fay and the band itself and was released on July 8, 2008 through Metal Blade Records. This is the band's first album to feature guitarist Zach Householder.

Release and background 
Upon the release of the record, its sales reached 5,900 in copies, which had it enter the Billboard Top 200 chart at position 118. Three music videos for songs from the album were released. The video for "This Is Exile" was released on June 18, 2008. The music video for "Possession" was released on November 18, 2008 and shown on MTV2's Headbangers Ball. The music video for "Eternal Refuge" was released on June 8, 2009.

This album marked a change in the group's thematic material;  while the two demos and the previous album The Somatic Defilement dealt with the Whitechapel murders, "This is Exile" moved past that and into anti-religious and corruption themes, the latter of which would be expanded up further in the next album.

The song "This Is Exile" is available as downloadable content for Rock Band, Rock Band 2 and Rock Band 3. The song is also used in the iPod Touch game, Tap Tap Revenge 3.

Track listing

Credits 
Production and performance credits are adapted from the album liner notes.

Personnel 
Whitechapel
 Phil Bozeman – vocals
 Ben Savage – lead guitar
 Alex Wade – guitar
 Zach Householder – guitar
 Gabe Crisp – bass
 Kevin Lane – drums

Guest musicians
 Guy Kozowyk (The Red Chord) – vocals on "Exalt"

Production
 Jonny Fay – engineering, editing, tracking, production
 Whitechapel – production
 "Zeuss" – mixing, mastering

Artwork and design
 Colin Marks – artwork
 Whitechapel – artwork concept

Studios 
 Backyard Studios in Milford, NH, US – tracking
 Planet Z, Hadley, MA, US – mixing, mastering

Charts

References

External links 
 
 This Is Exile at Metal Blade
 This Is Exile at Whitechapel's official website

2008 albums
Concept albums
Metal Blade Records albums
Whitechapel (band) albums